Frederick Nnabuenyi Ugonna, often abbreviated to F. Nnabuenyi Ugonna  (12 October 1936, in Amaokpara/Ihitenansa, Imo State, Nigeria – 5 June 1990, in London) was a Nigerian ethnologist, linguist, and writer. He is best known for his work on the Igbo language and other African languages as well as African literature.

Ugonna was the first who initiated the thesis of J. E. Casely Hayford's Ethiopia Unbound (1911) being the first truly African novel; therefore he wrote an introduction for the book's second edition, which was published by Frank Cass & Co in 1969.

Ugonna died of prostate cancer in 1990 in London.

References

External links
 Uwandiigbo.com - detailed biography (PDF file)

People from Imo State
Ethnologists
1936 births
1990 deaths
Linguists from Nigeria
Deaths from prostate cancer
20th-century linguists